Risk is the seventh album by Estonian rock band Terminaator, released in 2001. It is the official soundtrack for Terminaator's musical "Risk". Initially, the musical's name was "Rooste" (Rust)

Track listing 

 Avamäng [Opening] - 1:54
 Oodata ei saa [Can't wait] - 3:03
 Algeri räpp [Alger's rap] - 3:15
 Conjure - 2:46
 Kes tegi seda [Who did it] - 2:36
 Raha [Money] - 2:39
 Tänapäeva muinaslugu [Today's fairy tale] - 5:17
 II vaatuse avamäng [II act's opening] - 2:11
 Paranormaalse uurija laul [Paranormal investigator's song] - 1:45
 Tiibeti kujumehe ilmumine [The appearing of Tibet's statueman] - 1:19
 Vastused [Answers] - 3:31
 Omal kohal [In its place] - 3:29

External links 
 Estmusic.com Listen to the songs.

2001 albums
Terminaator albums
Estonian-language albums